The 2001-02 Thai Premier League consisted of 12 teams. The bottom three clubs would be relegated and three teams promoted from the Thailand Division 1 League.

Champions BEC Tero Sasana would enter edition the next edition of the AFC Champions League. The league was restructured, to be played between October 2001 and April 2002.

The league was also known as the GSM Thai League.

Member clubs

Bangkok Bank
BEC Tero Sasana
Sinthana 
Krung Thai Bank
Osotsapa M-150
Port Authority of Thailand
Royal Thai Navy
Rattana Bundit (renamed from - Bangkok Metropolitan Administration)
Royal Thai Air Force
Royal Thai Police
Thailand Tobacco Monopoly (''promoted from Division 1)
TOT

Final league table

Season notes

Bangkok Metropolitan Administration withdrew from the league due to a lack of money. Rattana Bundit was formed off the back of BMA and took their place in the Premier League. This was the second season running that a club would withdraw following on from Thai Farmers Bank

Queen's Cup

Osotsapa won their first Queen's Cup trophy. This was the 29th edition to be played.

Asian Representation

 BEC Tero Sasana would progress to the second round of the 2001–02 Asian Club Championship, but once again came up against, what now seemed to be an impossible mission of facing a team from Japan. Here, they would get beat once again by Kashima Antlers who now seemed to be a thorn in the side of Thai football clubs.
 Royal Thai Air Force reached the second round of the 2001–02 Asian Cup Winners Cup, where they were beaten by Home United of Singapore in a match played over two legs. They won the first leg at home, but then were thumped 5-0 in the return in Singapore.

Annual awards

Coach of the Year

 Attaphol Buspakom - BEC Tero Sasana

Player of the year

 Apichad Thaveechalermdit - Bangkok Bank

Top scorer

 Worrawoot Srimaka - 12 Goals BEC Tero Sasana
 Pitipong Kuldilok - 12 Goals Port Authority of Thailand

Champions
The league champion was BEC Tero Sasana. It was the team's second title.

References

Thailand 2001/02 RSSSF

External links
Official Website

Thai League
1
1
Thai League 1 seasons